This is a list of Assembly Members (AMs; Welsh: Aelodau'r Cynulliad, ACau) elected to the fourth National Assembly for Wales at the 2011 election. There are a total of 60 members elected, 40 were elected from first past the post constituencies with a further 20 members being returned from five regions, each electing four AMs through mixed member proportional representation. 20 AMs were elected for the first time.

Current composition

Constituency AMs

Regional AMs

See also

 1999 National Assembly for Wales election and Members of the 1st National Assembly for Wales
 2003 National Assembly for Wales election and Members of the 2nd National Assembly for Wales
 2007 National Assembly for Wales election and Members of the 3rd National Assembly for Wales
 2011 National Assembly for Wales election and Members of the 4th National Assembly for Wales
 2016 National Assembly for Wales election and Members of the 5th National Assembly for Wales
 List of Welsh Assembly by-elections
 National Assembly for Wales constituencies and electoral regions

References

Senedd